The Reverend (Edward) Adrian Woodruffe-Peacock  (23 July 1858 – 3 February 1922) was an English clergyman and ecologist. He was an early exponent of the ecological approach to natural history recording.

Early life

Woodruffe-Peacock, always known by his middle name of Adrian, was born at Bottesford Manor, north Lincolnshire, on 23 July 1858, the son of Edward Peacock (1831–1915), farmer, antiquarian, historian, and author, and his wife, Lucy Ann Wetherell (1823–1887). He had 6 siblings, including the folklorist Mabel Peacock. He was schooled at Edinburgh Academy (1870–73) and St Peter's School, York (1873). He then received private tuition in Lincolnshire until April 1877, when he was admitted to St John's College, Cambridge, to study mathematics, classics, science, and natural history. Shortage of money, poor health, and the decision to become an Anglican clergyman cut short his stay there.

In 1879 he transferred to Bishop Hatfield's Hall at Durham University. At Durham, he indulged in extensive botanising, boating, and tennis; his social life being so time-consuming that there were complaints he regarded the university as a private club. He sat for the degree examination at Easter 1881, but "scratched", thinking that he had failed his Latin paper and choosing to make arrangements to leave before receiving the results. However, this did not affect his career as he had already obtained his licentiate of theology in December 1880, and was subsequently ordained deacon in December 1881, and then priest in December 1883. Following university he held curacies at: Long Benton, Northumberland (1881–84); Barkingside, Essex (1884–85); Long Benton (1885–86); and finally at Harrington, Northamptonshire (1886–90).

Ecology

In 1891 he accepted the living at Cadney, 10 miles from his birthplace, where he stayed until 1920 and developed a reputation as a naturalist. This was a poor, sparsely populated parish; since Woodruffe-Peacock had to visit his widely scattered parishioners on foot, he became by inclination and necessity a tremendous walker, which afforded him the opportunity to make regular observations and to record the natural changes occurring over a limited area. His profile in the Oxford Dictionary of National Biography notes that his routes contained some of the best observed and documented habitats in the country.

Woodruffe-Peacock compiled a Critical Catalogue of Lincolnshire Plants (1894–1900), superseded by his Check-List of Lincolnshire Plants (1909), allegedly based on an analysis of half a million observations. In compiling the checklist he worked with botanists including: C.S. Stow, W. W.Mason, A. Bennet, J. Britten, W.H. Beeby, F.A. Lees, and Canon Fowler.

He took a leading role in the foundation of the Lincolnshire Naturalists' Union in 1893, serving as organizing secretary in 1895 and president in 1905. He was the prime mover in establishing a museum for Lincolnshire, his extensive herbarium forming an integral part of its original collections and the foundation of the city and county museum's herbarium. He was elected a fellow of both the Linnean Society and the Geological Society in 1895. Among his achievements was the pioneering of the small-scale ecological survey. He also appreciated the mechanisms of dispersal, a neglected aspect of British ecology, which he approached through the careful study of microhabitats. As the result of "half a dozen visits" to a Lincolnshire beck during a dry summer when the water was low, he noted over 58 species growing, coming from the seeds he had dispersed by the stream. He was also a pioneer in plotting the distribution of plants. As early as 1894 he had 20,000 "place notes" on the distribution of plant species tabulated in his "Locality Register".

He published an article, "A fox-covert study" in the Journal of Ecology, recently founded by botanist Arthur Tansley. The two eventually met on a field trip to Mildenhall in Suffolk and, surprisingly, since Tansley was an avowed atheist, became close friends. By this point Woodruffe-Peacock had been working on a detailed study, Rock-soil flora of Lincolnshire, for many years, and Tansley, impressed, offered to contribute £300 towards its publication. Owing to poor health, Woodruffe-Peacock was never able to make the necessary revisions and only a small section was ever published, the rest of the manuscript passing into the archives of Cambridge University Library. According to Brian J. Ford, these extensive notes show him to be ahead of his time in his approach to natural history.

Personal
Woodruffe-Peacock was tall and broad in proportion, but his health did not match up to his stature: most of his life he suffered from chronic hay fever and rheumatism. In 1920, by now Rector of Grayingham, he suffered an emotional setback when his sister Mabel died. A combination of this, the pressures of his new appointment, and the disappointment of his magnum opus requiring so many revisions, saw his health break down. He died on 3 February 1922 and was buried in an unmarked grave beside his sister.

References

1858 births
1922 deaths
19th-century English Anglican priests
20th-century English Anglican priests
English botanical writers
British ecologists
Alumni of Hatfield College, Durham
People educated at Edinburgh Academy
Alumni of St John's College, Cambridge
Durham University Boat Club rowers
People educated at St Peter's School, York
Fellows of the Linnean Society of London
Fellows of the Geological Society of London
People from the Borough of North Lincolnshire
British male rowers
Members of the Lincolnshire Naturalists' Union